Americium iodide may refer to:

 Americium(II) iodide
 Americium(III) iodide